The French Imperial Eagle (Aigle de drapeau, lit. "flag eagle") refers to the figure of an eagle on a staff carried into battle as a standard by the Grande Armée of Napoleon during the Napoleonic Wars.

Although they were presented with regimental colours, Napoleon's regiments tended to carry at their head the Imperial Eagle.

History

On 5 December 1804, three days after his coronation, Napoleon distributed aigles based on the eagle standards of the Roman legions. The standards represented the regiments raised by the various departments of France, and were intended to institute feelings of pride and loyalty among the troops who would be the backbone of Napoleon's new Imperial regime. Napoleon gave an emotional speech in which he insisted that troops should defend the standards with their lives. This event was depicted in The Distribution of the Eagle Standards, an 1810 painting by Jacques-Louis David.

The original design was sculpted by Antoine-Denis Chaudet and then copies were cast in the workshop of Pierre-Philippe Thomire, with the first eagles presented on 5 December 1804. It was a bronze sculpture of an eagle on a plinth, with one claw resting on "Jupiter's spindle". weighing , mounted on top of the blue regimental flagpole. On the base would be the regiment's number or, in the case of the Imperial Guard, Garde Impériale. The eagle bore the same significance to French Imperial regiments as the colours did to British regiments - to lose the eagle would bring shame to the regiment, who had pledged to defend it to the death. Upon Napoleon's fall, the restored monarchy of King Louis XVIII ordered all eagles to be destroyed; only a very small number were preserved. When the former emperor returned to power in 1815 (known as the Hundred Days), he immediately had more eagles produced, although the quality did not match the originals. The workmanship was of a lesser quality and the main distinguishing changes had the new models with closed beaks and they were set in a more crouched posture.

Captured eagles

The first capture of an eagle was most likely during the Battle of Austerlitz in 1805 when the Russian cavalry of the guard under Grand Duke Konstantin overran the French 4th Régiment d'Infanterie de Ligne, taking their flag. Although Napoleon won the battle, the Russians were able to retreat in good order and the eagle was not recovered, much to the emperor's regret.

An eagle was lost and several officers, including a colonel, were killed. The eagle was captured by NCO Anton Antonov of the Pernov Musketeers. Prussian historians dispute this, claiming that the Prittwitz Hussars captured the eagle.

In 1807, near Eylau, the  lost its flag and eagle to the Russian . In 1812 at Krasnoi, the 18th Régiment d'Infanterie de Ligne again lost its eagle and was "virtually destroyed" by the Russian .

In 1808, at the Battle of Bailén, the French corps led by General Dupont surrendered after being defeated by a Spanish army led by generals Castaños and Reding; this was the first surrender of an Imperial field army. As part of the capitulation terms, the French gave up their flags and banners, including three eagles. These eagles were kept in the Cathedral of Seville until they were recovered by the French in 1810 and sent back to Paris.

The first French eagles to be captured by the British were taken by during the Invasion of Martinique including the Eagle of the 82nd French Regiment of the Line. Subsequently the 87th Regiment of Foot took an Imperial Eagle at the Battle of Barrosa on 5 March 1811. Keogh only managed to get a hand on the shaft when he was shot, bayoneted and killed. Masterson took over and, after killing several men, wrenched the Eagle from the dying hands of its bearer, Lieutenant Gazan.

The eagle was taken back to the United Kingdom and put on display in the Royal Hospital Chelsea.  It was around 10 inches tall, set on a plinth marked with the numeral 8.  It was made of silver, but gilded, which led many to think it was solid gold.  In fact, the only golden part of the eagle was a laurel wreath which hung around its neck.  This wreath was an honour conferred upon the 8th Regiment by Napoleon himself, and was not common to all eagles at the time. The gold leaves were presented to a number of regiments that were present at the Battle of Austerlitz by the city of Paris.  The eagle's right claw was raised.  Beneath it should have been a thunderbolt but, on the 87th's trophy, it was missing.  It is believed to have been dislodged during its capture.

Several years later, the eagle was stolen from the Royal Hospital. It was broken from its staff and smuggled away to an unknown fate.  Many rumours abounded, the strongest being that it had been repatriated by a Frenchman.  More likely it was melted down and sold.  The original staff is still held in the Royal Irish Fusiliers Museum, located in the Sovereign's House on The Mall in Armagh, Northern Ireland.

The British took two eagles at the Battle of Salamanca in July 1812.

Two of the newer French regimental eagles were captured during the Battle of Waterloo in 1815.

Before the Duke of Wellington died in 1852, he had asked that all his battle trophies be carried at his funeral. As the eagle captured by the 87th Regiment of Foot was not available, it was decided to make a replica. The mould was made by Garrard's and was designed from a sketch of the original drawn by an officer of the 87th at the time of Barrosa.

The capture of an eagle was celebrated through the addition of the eagle as a symbol or accoutrement to a regiment's colour or uniform. The Blues and Royals (Royal Horse Guards and 1st Dragoons) (descended from the 1st Royal Dragoons) and the Royal Anglian Regiment (descended from the 44th Foot) both wear the eagle as an arm badge, while the cap badge of the Royal Scots Dragoon Guards (Carabiniers and Greys) (descended from the Royal Scots Greys) is an eagle. The Royal Irish Regiment wear the eagle of the 8th on the back pouch of the officers' black cross belt.

The 1st Régiment de Grenadiers had formed two squares at the Battle of Waterloo, one of which was formed around Napoleon himself. In May 2015, the Isabella Stewart Gardner Museum offered a reward of $100,000 for the safe return of the Eagle which remains missing.

See also
Historical colours, standards and guidons

References

Sources

External links 

 French Napoleonic Infantry 1800-1815

Sculptures
First French Empire
Mythological birds of prey
Birds in art
Imperial Eagle
Fictional birds